The Totem Pole is a sea stack popular amongst rockclimbers in the Tasman National Park, Tasmania, Australia. It contains a number of climbing routes, and is famous for being the site of the 1998 accident which caused climber Paul Pritchard's hemiplegia.

First ascent
The Totem Pole was first climbed in 1968 by John Ewbank and Allan Keller and freed by Doug McConnel and Dean Rollins.

Lynn Hill attempted the first onsight, but fell after breaking a hold, leaving Monique Forestier to onsight it a few years later.

Paul Pritchard's accident 
Paul planned on climbing the Totem Pole in 1998 with his partner Celia when, after abseiling down, his rope caught a large rock which fell  onto his head. Celia ran  back to Fortescue Bay to call for help. He survived on the ledge for eight hours before he was rescued and was left paralysed on his left side and with speech and memory difficulties.  He later wrote a book about the experience and returned in 2016 to complete the climb.

Rock type 
Tasmania is known for its igneous dolerite pillars, which are popular amongst climbers. These pillars were formed by volcanic activity extruding magma from the ground, which when cooled at a constant rate creates rare hexagonal pillars. These form via a slightly different mechanism to usual sea-stacks, and can be found at other rock-climbing sites around the state including Mount Wellington's Organ Pipes.

Gallery

References

Tourist attractions in Tasmania
Stacks of Australia
Coastline of Tasmania
Tasman National Park
Climbing routes